Peter Parkinson (January 22, 1813 in Carter County, Tennessee – May 30, 1895 in Fayette, Wisconsin) was a member of the Wisconsin State Assembly.

His father, Daniel Morgan Parkinson, was also a member of the Assembly. Parkinson served in the Black Hawk War under Henry Dodge and later as an officer with the 2d Stryker Cavalry Regiment.

Political career
Parkinson was a member of the Assembly in 1854. He was a Democrat.

References

People from Carter County, Tennessee
Democratic Party members of the Wisconsin State Assembly
American people of the Black Hawk War
Military personnel from Wisconsin
United States Army officers
1813 births
1895 deaths
19th-century American politicians
People from Fayette, Wisconsin